The Amazing Race 10 is the tenth season of the American reality television show The Amazing Race. It featured twelve teams of two competing in a race around the world.

The season premiered on CBS on September 17, 2006, and concluded on December 10, 2006.

Professional models Tyler Denk and James Branaman were the winners of this season, while dating couple Rob Diaz and Kimberly Chabolla finished in second place, and single mothers Lyn Turk and Karlyn Harris finished in third.

Production

Development and filming

The Amazing Race 10 spanned  and covered four continents and thirteen countries. Among them were six that were new to the series: Mongolia, Kuwait, Mauritius, Madagascar, Finland, and Ukraine. It was also the first season to circumnavigate the globe in a generally westward fashion, crossing the Pacific Ocean on the first leg and crossing the Atlantic on the final leg.

The Amazing Race 10 saw the show's first double elimination in a single leg, when one team was eliminated halfway through the leg and the other at the end. It also introduced a new obstacle, the Intersection, which required two teams to work together until otherwise instructed. The Intersection was also shown in conjunction with a Fast Forward, allowing both teams working together to receive the benefit of the Fast Forward.

Additionally, the penalty for coming in last on a non-elimination leg was changed. Instead of being stripped of their money and possessions, the last place team was "marked for elimination". This meant that the marked team suffered a 30-minute penalty at the next pit stop unless they were first to check in.

During the legs in Vietnam, all route markers were colored yellow and white rather than red and yellow, so as to avoid confusion with the flag of the former independent state of South Vietnam.

During the leg in Ukraine, host Phil Keoghan was detained at the airport for traveling to the country with a New Zealand passport and without a Ukrainian visa, which he had been informed prior to filming wasn't needed. He was released the next day, after a worker from the American embassy processed a visa for him. After being released, Keoghan arrived at the pit stop ten minutes before the lead team arrived.

Awards 
Season 10 won the 2007 Primetime Emmy Award for Outstanding Reality-Competition Program. This was the series' fifth consecutive win in that category, having won every year since the category was first introduced in 2003.

Cast 

The cast of The Amazing Race 10 was increased to twelve teams for the first time since season 4. It included best friends, a couple, college cheerleaders, boyfriends, brothers, a Paralympian with a prosthetic leg, recovering drug addicts, beauty pageant queens, and a pair of single mothers.

While Peter & Sarah were portrayed as a newly dating couple, to the extent that Sarah seemingly broke up with Peter during their elimination in Kuwait, Sarah Reinertsen revealed that they were only friends whose "dating" was non-existent and created to give them an interesting storyline, although she did say that her displeasure over Peter's cold and hectoring behavior on the show was genuine.

Future appearances
Dustin & Kandice and David & Mary were selected to race in The Amazing Race: All-Stars. 

David & Mary also appeared on The View where they received gifts from the show, including vacations, a Ford Explorer, and a new house. In 2021, Tom Rock and Terry Cosentino competed on Ellen's Game of Games.

Results
The following teams are listed with their placements in each leg. Placements are listed in finishing order. 
A  placement with a dagger indicates that the team was eliminated. 
An  placement with a double-dagger indicates that the team was the last to arrive at a pit stop in a non-elimination leg, and was "marked for elimination" in the following leg.
An italicized placement indicates a team's placement at the midpoint of a double leg.
A  indicates that the team won the Fast Forward. 
A  indicates that the team used the Yield and a  indicates the team on the receiving end of the Yield.
A  indicates that the teams encountered an Intersection. 

Notes

Race summary

Leg 1 (United States → China)

Episode 1: "Real Fast! Quack, Quack!" (September 17, 2006)
Prize:  (awarded to Tyler & James)
Eliminated: Bilal & Sa'eed  Vipul & Arti
Locations
Seattle, Washington (Gas Works Park) (Starting Line)
 Seattle → Beijing, China
Beijing (Gold House Restaurant) 
Beijing (Forbidden City – Meridian Gate) 
Beijing (14 Houhai North Bank Road)
 Beijing (Run De Li Market  Beihai Park) 
Beijing (Great Wall of China – Juyongguan) 
Episode summary
Teams set off from Gas Works Park and made their way to Seattle–Tacoma International Airport, where they had to book one of two flights to Beijing, China. Six teams were on an earlier United Airlines flight, while the remaining six teams were on a Korean Airlines flight scheduled to arrive one hour later. Once in Beijing, teams had to make their way to the Gold House Restaurant, where they found their next clue.
 In this season's first Roadblock, one team member had to eat all of the eyeballs from a fish head soup in order to receive their next clue.
After completing the Roadblock, teams had to travel to the Meridian Gate in the Forbidden City, where they had to find a kiosk and pick one of three departure times the next morning. The last team to arrive at the Meridian Gate – Bilal & Sa'eed – was eliminated. The next morning, teams had to direct the driver of a World War II-era sidecar motorbike to 14 Houhai North Bank Road and find the pedicab manager in order to receive their next clue.
 This season's first Detour was a choice between Labor or Leisure. In Labor, teams had to travel  by pedicab to Run De Li Market, where they had to use traditional Chinese bricks to pave a  section of sidewalk in a specific pattern in order to receive their next clue. In Leisure, teams had to travel  by pedicab to Beihai Park and participate in a Chinese relaxation exercise known as Taiji Bailong, in which they had to successfully balance a ball on a paddle in order to receive their next clue.
At the Juyongguan section of the Great Wall of China, teams had to use a rope to scale the wall in order to reach the pit stop.

Leg 2 (China → Mongolia)

Episode 2: "Can Horses Smell Fear?" (September 24, 2006)
Prize: A trip to Mexico (awarded to Peter & Sarah)
Eliminated: Kellie & Jamie
Locations
Beijing (Great Wall of China – Juyongguan) 
 Beijing → Erenhot
 Erenhot → Ulaanbaatar, Mongolia
Ulaanbaatar (Choijin Lama Temple)
Terelj (Gorkhi-Terelj National Park) 
Ulaanbaatar (Hotel Mongolia)  
Episode summary
At the beginning of this leg, teams had to sign up for one of two buses departing two hours apart to Erenhot, where they then had to travel by train to Ulaanbaatar, Mongolia. Once in Ulaanbaatar, teams had to go to the Choijin Lama Temple, where they had to observe a ceremony before receiving their next clue. Teams were directed to drive to Gorkhi-Terelj National Park, where they had to don traditional Mongolian army hats and ride horses  until they reached a meadow with their next clue.
 This leg's Detour was a choice between Take It Down or Fill It Up. In Take It Down, teams chose a nomadic shelter called a yurt, took the canvas and roof down, packaged it for transport, and loaded it onto a camel in order to receive their next clue. In Fill It Up, teams had to take a cart, pulled by a hynik (an indigenous ox),  to a river, fill four water containers, and bring them back to fill a barrel in order to receive their next clue.
After completing the Detour, teams had to travel to the Hotel Mongolia in Ulaanbaatar in order to find their next clue.
After hitting the target, teams could run uphill to the nearby pit stop.

Leg 3 (Mongolia → Vietnam)

Episode 3: "Oh, Wow! It's Like One of Those Things You See on TV!" (October 1, 2006)
Prize: A state-of-the-art home theater system (awarded to Erwin & Godwin)
Eliminated: Duke & Lauren
Locations
Ulaanbaatar (Hotel Mongolia) 
Ulaanbaatar (Chinggis Khaan Hotel)
 Ulaanbaatar → Hanoi, Vietnam
Hanoi (Hỏa Lò Prison)
Hanoi (Old Quarter – Thoa Flower Shop) 
 Hanoi → Phố Vác
Phố Vác (Dinh Vác Temple)
Phố Vác (Home of Nguyĕn Văn Thuý  Nhà Thò) 
Phố Vác (Canh Dong Dia) 
Episode summary
At the beginning of this leg, teams had to make their way to the Chinggis Khaan Hotel, where they booked a flight to Hanoi, Vietnam. Once in Hanoi, teams had to travel to Hỏa Lò Prison and search the grounds for the room displaying John McCain's flight suit in order to receive their next clue, which directed them to the Thoa Flower Shop in Hanoi's Old Quarter.
 In this leg's Roadblock, one team member had to choose a bicycle with a basket of flowers and sell enough to make at least 80,000₫ (roughly $5) in order to receive their next clue.
After completing the Roadblock, teams were instructed to travel by bus to Phố Vác and then make their way to Dinh Vác Temple in order to find their next clue.
 This leg's Detour was a choice between Fuel or Fowl. In Fuel, teams had to travel to the home of Nguyĕn Văn Thuý and make 30 acceptable round coal bricks by putting wet coal into a traditional press in order to receive their next clue. In Fowl, teams had to travel to Nhà Thò, where they had to use traditional local materials to properly build an intricate Vietnamese birdcage in order to receive their next clue.
Teams had to check in at the pit stop: Canh Dong Dia in Phố Vác.
Additional notes
Teams were given no money at the start of this leg and were instructed that they could not beg or sell anything during the leg to earn money. Teams could only keep the money that they earned during the Roadblock.

Leg 4 (Vietnam)

Episode 4: "I Know Phil, Little Ol' Gorgeous Thing" (October 8, 2006)
Prize: A jet-ski for each team member (awarded to Rob & Kimberly)
Eliminated: Tom & Terry
Locations
Phố Vác (Canh Dong Dia) 
Hanoi (Lý Thái Tổ Garden)
 Hanoi → Hạ Long
Hạ Long (Hydrofoil Harbor)
 Hạ Long Bay (Hòn Yên Ngựa) 
 Hạ Long Bay (Sửng Sốt Cave ) 
 Hạ Long Bay (Soi Sim Island) 
Episode summary
At the beginning of this leg, teams had to pick up 588,000₫ (roughly $37) from a nearby table. They then traveled to Lý Thái Tổ Garden in Hanoi, where they had to listen to their next clue recited over a loudspeaker: "Attention racers! Here is your clue! Taxi across the Red River to Bến Xe Gia Lâm. Then take a bus to Bến Xe Bãi Cháy. Then find the Hydrofoil Harbor."
 In this leg's Roadblock, one team member had to use a mechanical ascender to climb  up the sheer face of the cliff at Hòn Yên Ngựa, retrieve their clue, and then rappel back down.
After completing the Roadblock, teams were instructed to travel by motorboat to Sửng Sốt Cave and search the caves for their next clue.
 This leg's Detour was a choice between Over or Under. For both Detour options, teams were taken to the water by a junk and then given a sampan to row to their task. In Over, teams had to row to a provisions ship, load supplies onto the sampan, and then row to a floating village and deliver goods to the specific addresses on their invoice. When finished, teams rowed back to present the completed invoice to the captain, who gave them their next clue. In Under, teams had to take a marked buoy and row the sampan to a pearl farm, where they chose a line of buoys and hauled 30 baskets out of the sea and onto their boats. They had to deliver the baskets to a pearl farmer in order to receive their next clue.
After completing the Detour, teams had to take a junk to the pit stop at Soi Sim Island in Hạ Long Bay.

Leg 5 (Vietnam → India)

Episode 5: "I Covered His Mouth, Oh My Gosh!" (October 15, 2006)
Prize: A home gym center for each team member (awarded to Peter & Sarah)
Locations
Hạ Long (Bến Xe Bãi Cháy) 
 Haiphong → Hanoi
 Hanoi → Chennai, India
 Chennai → Mamallapuram
Mamallapuram (Vallavar Arts & Crafts)
Vadanemmeli (Madras Crocodile Bank)  Mamallapuram (Sri Sthala Sayana Perumal Temple) 
 Vadanemmeli  Mamallapuram → Chennai
Chennai (Karthik Driving School) 
Chennai (Chettinad House) 
Episode summary
At the beginning of this leg, teams were instructed to travel by train back to Hanoi, and then fly to Chennai, India. Once in Chennai, teams had to travel by bus to Mamallapuram and then find their next clue at Vallavar Arts & Crafts.
 This leg's Detour was a choice between Wild Things or Wild Rice. In Wild Things, teams had to travel  to the Madras Crocodile Bank and help the workers wrangle and transport a marsh crocodile to a new pit in order to receive the next clue. In Wild Rice, teams had to travel  to the Sri Sthala Sayana Perumal Temple and chose an outline of a traditional floral design shown on the temple floor. Using a picture for reference, they had to use colored powder made from rice to color in the outline so that it matched the picture in order to receive their next clue.
After completing the Detour, teams had to travel by bus back to Chennai and then make their way to the Karthik Driving School.
 In this leg's Roadblock, one team member had to attend a driver's education class and then pass a driving test while driving on the left-hand side of the congested streets in order to receive their next clue and an Indian driver's license.
After completing the Roadblock, the team member who completed it had to drive their partner in their instructor's car to the pit stop at the Chettinad House in Chennai.
Additional notes
Due to Vietnamese regulations, teams couldn't purchase tickets at an airline counter, so they had to book their flight at a travel agency beforehand. 
This was a non-elimination leg.

Leg 6 (India → Kuwait)

Episode 6: "Maybe Steven Seagal Will See Me And Want Me to Be in One of His Movies" (October 22, 2006)
Prize: A trip to Jamaica (awarded to David & Mary)
Eliminated: Peter & Sarah
Locations
Chennai (Chettinad House) 
 Chennai → Kuwait City, Kuwait
Kuwait City (Kuwait Towers) 
Kuwait City (6th Ring Road) 
Kuwait City (Souk Al-Gharabally )
Sulaibiya (Souk Sulaibiya)  Kabed (Kuwait Camel Racing Club) 
Kuwait City (Al-Sadiq Water Towers) 
Episode summary
At the beginning of this leg, teams received a mobile phone with a video message depicting a landmark, which they had to determine was the Kuwait Towers. After flying to Kuwait City, Kuwait, they had to drive to the towers in order to find their next clue.
They then had to return to the ground and assemble the puzzle that, when completed, identified their next destination, Al-Gharabally Street, in Arabic (الغربللي سوق شارع).
David & Mary won the Fast Forward.
After completing the Roadblock, teams had to travel to the Souk Al-Gharabally, where they had to find a marked stall in the marketplace in order to receive their next clue.
 This leg's Detour was a choice between Manual or Automatic. In Manual, teams drove to Souk Sulaibiya and had to fill ten  bags of camel feed, transport them  to a pallet, and properly stack them in order to receive their next clue. In Automatic, teams had to go to the Kuwait Camel Racing Club, where they used a walkie-talkie to operate a voice activated robotic jockey attached to a camel. When the camel ran a  course, they could receive their next clue.
Teams had to check in at the pit stop: the Al-Sadiq Water Towers in Kuwait City.
Additional notes
Peter & Sarah fell so far behind that all of the other teams had already checked in at the pit stop before they arrived at the Detour. Peter & Sarah were instructed to go directly to the pit stop for elimination.

Leg 7 (Kuwait → Mauritius)

Episode 7: "I Wonder If This Is Going to Make My Fingers Pickle" (October 29, 2006)
Prize: A motor scooter for each team member (awarded to Dustin & Kandice)
Locations
Kuwait City (Al-Sadiq Water Towers) 
 Kuwait City → Plaine Magnien, Mauritius
Grand Baie (Isla Mauritia)
Case Noyale (Post Office)
Rivière Noire District (Les Salines de Petite Rivière Noire  Île aux Benitiers) 
Bel Ombre (Château Bel Ombre) 
Episode summary
At the beginning of this leg, teams were instructed to fly to Mauritius. Once there, teams had to search inside a marked vehicle for a model boat, which had the clue "Isla Mauritia" and "Swim to Me". Teams had to figure out that their next location was Grand Baie, where they had to swim out to the ship in order to receive their next clue, and then swim back to shore. Teams then had to find their next clue at the post office in Case Noyale.
 This leg's Detour was a choice between Salt or Sea. In Salt, teams had to search through three piles of salt for a salt shaker containing their next clue. In Sea, teams had to choose a boat pilot and then travel  by motorboat to Île aux Benitiers. There, they had to search the island using a treasure map in order to find the boat's sail that they had to carry back to the boat and attach before sailing back to the starting point, where they received their next clue.
Teams had to check in at the pit stop: the Château Bel Ombre in Bel Ombre.
Additional notes
This was a non-elimination leg.

Leg 8 (Mauritius → Madagascar)

Episode 8: "He Can't Swim But He Can Eat Cow Lips!" (November 5, 2006)
Prize: A trip to the Kona coast of Hawaii (awarded to Dustin & Kandice)
Eliminated: David & Mary
Locations
Bel Ombre (Château Bel Ombre) 
 Plaine Magnien → Antananarivo, Madagascar
Antananarivo (Lac Anosy – Black Angel Statue)  
Antananarivo (Analakely Market ) 
Antananarivo (Tohotohobato Ambondrona Analakely) 
Antananarivo (Cathedral Andohalo) 
Episode summary
At the beginning of this leg, teams were instructed to fly to Antananarivo, Madagascar. Once there, teams had to make their way to the Black Angel Statue at Lac Anosy in order to find their next clue.
 At the Black Angel statue, teams encountered an Intersection, where teams were required to work together in pairs to complete tasks until further notice. The teams were paired up thusly: Tyler & James and Rob & Kimberly, Lyn & Karlyn and David & Mary, and Dustin & Kandice and Erwin & Godwin.
 This season's second Fast Forward required one pair of newly-joined teams to go to the Analakely Market, where each team member had to eat one full serving of cow lips. Tyler & James and Rob & Kimberly won the Fast Forward.
 This leg's Detour was a choice between Long Sleep or Short Letter. In Long Sleep, the newly-joined teams had to travel  to an open market, where they had to wrap eight mattresses with a cover and deliver them on foot approximately  through the streets of Antananarivo to a specific address in order to receive their next clue. In Short Letter, the newly-joined teams had to travel  to a paper-working station where they had to work together to successfully make 28 pieces of handcrafted paper in order to receive their next clue.
After completing the Detour, the Intersection was ended. Teams had to travel to Tohotohobato Ambondrona Analakely in order to receive their next clue.
 In this leg's Roadblock, one team member had to go up a steep staircase and find four different rubber stamp vendors with stamps matching those on their clue. Once they collected all four stamps, they could then proceed to the pit stop at the Cathedral Andohalo, where their teammate was waiting.

Leg 9 (Madagascar → Finland → Ukraine)

Episode 9: "Being Polite Sucks Sometimes" (November 12, 2006)& Episode 10: "Lookin' Like a Blue-Haired Lady on a Sunday Drive" (November 19, 2006)
Prize: A trip to Puerto Vallarta, Mexico (awarded to Tyler & James)
Eliminated: Erwin & Godwin
Locations
Antananarivo (Cathedral Andohalo) 
 Antananarivo → Helsinki, Finland
Helsinki (Kappeli Café)
 Helsinki → Tampere
Ylöjärvi (Soppeenharjun Koulu ) 
 Tampere → Turku
Lohja (Tytyri Limestone Mine) 
Helsinki (Helsinki Olympic Stadium Tower)
 Helsinki → Kyiv, Ukraine
Oster (Oster Tank School) 
Kyiv (Apartment 33)
Kyiv (Dance & Groove  National Music Academy of Ukraine) 
Kyiv (Great Patriotic War Museum – The Motherland Monument ) 
Episode summary (Episode 9)
At the beginning of this leg, teams were instructed to fly to Helsinki, Finland. Once in Helsinki, teams traveled to the Kappeli Café and found a laptop, which they used to watch a video from their loved ones before receiving their next clue. Teams were then directed to travel by train to Tampere, and then by taxi to Ylöjärvi, where they followed a marked path outside the Soppeenharjun Koulu in order to find their next clue.
 This leg's first Detour was a choice between Swamp This or Swamp That. In Swamp This, teams had to trudge through a bog on cross country skis and complete a  course. In Swamp That, teams had to complete an obstacle course through a bog, requiring them to crawl, climb, and carry each other. At the end of both tasks, teams received their next clue.
After completing the first Detour, teams were directed to travel by train to Turku, and then to the Tytyri Limestone Mine in Lohja, where they found their next clue.
 In this leg's first Roadblock, one team member had to ride a bike down a steep hill and search the Lohja mine for a dig site, where they had to retrieve a piece of limestone before returning to the starting point. They then used provided tools to break the limestone open in order to retrieve their next clue inside.
Teams were instructed to make their way to the Helsinki Olympic Stadium. There, teams went to the top of the  tower and then had to do a face-first rappel known as an Angel Dive. When teams completed this task, they received their next clue, which informed them that they had to keep racing.
Episode summary (Episode 10)
Teams were instructed to fly to the capital city of the country that was the site of the Chernobyl disaster, and had to figure out that their destination was Kyiv, Ukraine. Once in Kyiv, teams found their next clue on the windshield of their marked cars, which directed them to the Oster Tank School.
 In this leg's second Roadblock, one team member had to drive a Soviet-built T-64 tank through a  oval-shaped training course used for simulated military exercises in order to receive their next clue.
After completing the second Roadblock, teams were instructed to return to Kyiv and knock on the door of a particular apartment in order to receive their next clue.
 This leg's second Detour was a choice between Make the Music or Find the Music. In Make the Music, teams had to travel  to Dance & Groove, a hip hop dance club, where they had to write and perform a rap song incorporating the names of all of the nations they'd visited so far in order to receive their next clue. In Find the Music, teams had to travel  to the National Music Academy of Ukraine. There, they had to search through thousands of pieces of sheet music for Pyotr Ilyich Tchaikovsky's Concert Fantasia for Piano and Orchestra. When teams had the correct music, they had to search the 120 practice rooms to find one of six pianists who could perform the piece for them before handing them their next clue.
Teams had to check in at the pit stop: The Motherland Monument in Kyiv.
Additional notes
Due to limited availability of flights out of Madagascar, teams were given tickets on a flight from Antananarivo to Paris, but they were under no obligation to use them.
Leg 9 was a double leg that aired over two episodes.

Leg 10 (Ukraine → Morocco)

Episode 11: "We Just Won't Die, Like Roaches" (November 26, 2006)
Prize: A mobile phone with a year's subscription for each team member (awarded to Tyler & James)
Locations
Kyiv (Great Patriotic War Museum – The Motherland Monument ) 
 Kyiv → Ouarzazate, Morocco
Ouarzazate (Kasbah Taourirt – Antiquités du Sud)
Ouarzazate (Atlas Studios)  
Idelssan (Café La Pirgola)
Guedara (Pottery Shop)  North Africa Horse 
Atlas Mountains (Nomadic Berber Camp) 
Episode summary
At the beginning of this leg, teams were instructed to fly to Ouarzazate, Morocco. Once in Ouarzazate, teams had to find Antiquités du Sud, where they had to choose one of four Hand of Fatima pendants, one of which would match the pendant worn by the greeter at the pit stop. Teams then received their next clue from the shopkeeper, directing them to Atlas Studios, where they had to search the studio's backlot in order find their next clue.
 In this leg's Roadblock, one team member had to dress like a gladiator and ride in a chariot. While racing, racers had to pull down two colored flags matching the plume on their horse in order to receive their next clue.
After completing the Roadblock, teams had to go to Café La Pirgola in Idelssan in order to find their next clue.
 This leg's Detour was a choice between Throw It or Grind It. In Throw It, teams had to drive  to a pottery shop in Guedara, where they had to throw two clay pots on a potter's wheel to the specification of the artisan in order to receive their next clue. In Grind It, teams had to drive  to North Africa Horse, where they had to use a crushing mill to grind  of olives and pack them into pressing sleeves before receiving their next clue.
After completing the Detour, teams had to drive  towards Marrakesh until they reached a marked boulder directing them towards a Berber camp that served as the pit stop.
Additional notes
Whichever team had the pendant that matched the one worn by the pit stop greeter would win the prize. Tyler & James won the prize.
 Dustin & Kandice chose to Yield Lyn & Karlyn.
This was a non-elimination leg.

Leg 11 (Morocco → Spain)

Episode 12: "Dude, I'm Such a Hot Giant Chick Right Now!" (December 3, 2006)
Prize: A trip to Barbados (awarded to Rob & Kimberly)
Eliminated: Dustin & Kandice
Locations
Atlas Mountains (Nomadic Berber Camp) 
Casablanca (Quartier des Habous)
Casablanca (Cafe 11) 
 Casablanca → Barcelona, Spain
Barcelona (Parc del Laberint d'Horta)
Barcelona (Maremagnum Bridge & Plaça de Sant Felip Neri)  Santa Coloma de Cervelló (Colònia Güell) 
Barcelona (Palau Nacional de Montjuïc) 
Episode summary
At the beginning of this leg, teams had to drive to Casablanca, make their way to the Quartier des Habous, and then search the marketplace for their next clue.
 In this leg's Roadblock, one team member had to obtain  of camel meat from a stall and bring it to Cafe 11. There, they had to ground, season, and skewer the meat, give the skewers to a chef to cook, and then to eat the dish in order to receive their next clue.
Teams were then instructed to fly to Barcelona, Spain. Once in Barcelona, teams had to make their way to Parc del Laberint d'Horta and search the maze for their next clue.
 This leg's Detour was a choice between Lug It or Lob It. In Lug It, teams had to travel to the Maremagnum Bridge and don giant costumes known as gigantes y cabezudos. They then had to walk over a mile wearing their costumes and find a female giant at Plaça de Sant Felip Neri in order to receive their next clue. In Lob It, teams had to travel to Colònia Güell and take part in a tomato festival. While locals threw tomatoes at them, teams had to search a giant pile of tomatoes for one with a clue inside.
Teams had to check in at the pit stop: Palau Nacional de Montjuïc in Barcelona.

Leg 12 (Spain → France → United States)

Episode 13: "Say Your Deepest Prayers Ever!" (December 10, 2006)
Winners: Tyler & James
Second Place: Rob & Kimberly
Third Place: Lyn & Karlyn
Locations
Barcelona (Palau Nacional de Montjuïc) 
Barcelona (Sagrada Família)
 Barcelona → Paris, France
Paris (Eiffel Tower)
 Paris → Caen
Carpiquet (Caen – Carpiquet Airport) 
 Bayeux → Paris
Paris (Place de la Concorde – Pont de la Concorde)
Paris (Anatomy Fashion Studio) 
 Paris → New York City, New York
New York City (Daily News Building)
New York City (Alamo)
Garrison (Saint Basil Academy) 
Episode summary
At the beginning of this leg, teams were instructed to travel to "a church that has been under construction for over 124 years", and teams had to figure out that their next clue was located at the Sagrada Família. Teams were then instructed to fly to Paris, France. Once in Paris, teams had to travel to the Eiffel Tower and ride the elevator to the top in order to find their next clue, which instructed them to travel by train to Caen.
 In this season's final Roadblock, one team member had to perform a  tandem skydive with an instructor over Normandy. Their team member remained in the plane and was treated to a surprise nosedive. The skydiver landed on Omaha Beach, received their next clue, and was taken to the Bayeux train station, where they were reunited with their partner.
Teams had to travel by train back to Paris, and then make their way to the Pont de la Concorde in order to find their next clue.
 This season's final Detour was a choice between Art or Fashion. In Art, teams would have had to go to an art studio on the Rue de Varenne, choose a painting, and then carry it through the streets to a painter at the Pont de la Tournelle, who would have given them their next clue. In Fashion, teams had to travel by foot to Anatomy Fashion Studio, where they had to make a jacket using the tools and materials provided and then put it on a mannequin for display. Once the designer approved their work, she gave them their next clue. All teams chose to assemble a jacket.
Teams were then instructed to fly to New York City. Once there, teams had to find the Daily News Building and search for their next clue by a giant globe. Teams received a photograph of the Alamo with instructions to travel there on foot. There, teams had to find a woman in a yellow cap, who gave them their final clue directing them to the finish line at Saint Basil Academy in Garrison, New York.
Additional notes
Lyn & Karlyn arrived in Paris from Barcelona at Orly Airport, and chose to return to Orly Airport when it was time to book their flight to New York City. After arriving at Orly, they were informed that they would need to go to Charles de Gaulle International Airport in order to fly to New York City. They were unable to make the same flight as Tyler & James and Rob & Kimberly, and arrived in New York City after the other teams had already crossed the finish line.

Reception

Critical response
The Amazing Race 10 received mixed reviews. Linda Holmes of Television Without Pity was critical of this season's boot order, but said, "So was the season disappointing? It was not." Eric Goldman of IGN called it a solid season. Heather Havrilesky of Salon wrote that "after so much shared struggle and heartbreak, we find that we can hardly remember a single detail from our time with these strangers." In 2016, this season was ranked 14th out of the first 27 seasons by the Rob Has a Podcast Amazing Race correspondents. In 2021, Val Barone of TheThings ranked this season as the show's 5th best season.

Ratings
Canadian ratings

References

External links
Official website

 10
2006 American television seasons
Television shows filmed in Washington (state)
Television shows filmed in China
Television shows filmed in Mongolia
Television shows filmed in Vietnam
Television shows filmed in Thailand
Television shows filmed in India
Television shows filmed in Kuwait
Television shows filmed in Mauritius
Television shows filmed in Madagascar
Television shows filmed in Finland
Television shows filmed in Poland
Television shows filmed in Ukraine
Television shows filmed in Italy
Television shows filmed in Morocco
Television shows filmed in Spain
Television shows filmed in France
Television shows filmed in New York (state)